Before It Hits Home is a play by Cheryl West.

Background
The show was originally workshopped by the Seattle Group Theatre at the Multicultural Playwrights Festival in 1989, then later was given a reading at the Circle Repertory Company in 1990.

Productions
The original production opened in January 1991, at the Arena Stage, directed by Tazewell Thompson, set design Douglas Stein, lighting design Nancy Schertler, costume design Helen Qizhi Huang, and sound design Susan R. White. The cast starred Michael Jayce (Wendal), Cynthia Martells (Simone/Mrs. Peterson), Keith Randolph Smith (Douglas), Trazana Beverley (Reba), Mercedes Herrero (Nurse), Sandra Reaves-Phillips (Maybelle), Julian Hughes (Doctor), Wally Taylor (Bailey), Ryan Richmond (Dwayne), and Lee Simon Jr. (Junior).

The production then had its Off-Broadway premiere at LuEster Hall in February 1992, directed by Thompson, set design Loy Arcenas, costume design Paul Tazewell, lighting design Schertler, and sound design White. The cast starred James McDaniel (Wendal), Sharon Washington (Simone/Mrs. Peterson), Smith (Douglass), Yvette Hawkins (Reba), Marcella Lowery (Maybelle), Frankie Faison (Bailey), James Jason Lilley (Dwayne), Carol Honda (Nurse), Beth Dixon (Dr. Weinberg), and Monti Sharp (Junior).

Reviews
Frank Rich of the New York Times said the show has "validity and brute force" and that it's "authentic, at times almost hysterical wake-up call to the black community, sounded from within."

Awards and nominations

References

External links
 

1990s LGBT literature
1991 plays
HIV/AIDS in theatre
LGBT-related plays
Off-Broadway plays